Hot Flash Heat Wave is an American indie rock band originally from Davis, California, now based in the Excelsior District of San Francisco, California. Their sound has been described as "surfer pop meets post punk" and "dream pop".

History
The members of Hot Flash Heat Wave all grew up in Davis, California, and first met in high school. The members came up with the name Hot Flash Heat Wave due to a period of hot weather in San Francisco. In 2015, Hot Flash Heat Wave released their first full-length album, Neapolitan. In June 2016, the band released their first song since their debut full-length album, titled "Bye Bye Baby". In March 2017, Hot Flash Heat Wave announced their second full-length album, released by OIM Records. The album, titled Soaked, was released on June 2, 2017. The album was produced by Jeff Saltzman.

In November 2018, Hot Flash Heat Wave released a song titled "Dreaming of U", featuring Sophie Meiers. In early 2019, they released another new song, titled "Sky So Blue". In September 2020, the band released their song titled "Grudge". Throughout 2021, the group release three singles, "m o t i o n s", "Vampires", and "Where I'm @". The group announced that their single, "Bay boys" would be released on the 11th of February, and their next album on the 11th of March.

Band members
Ted Davis - Bass and Vocals
Adam Abilgaard - Guitar and Vocals
Nick Duffy - Drums

Discography
Studio albums
Neapolitan (2015)
Soaked (2017)
Mood Ring EP (2019)
Sportswear (2022)

References

Musical groups from Davis, California